Cryptocellus adisi is an arachnid species in the order Ricinulei. It occurs in Central Amazonia in Brazil.

References

 Platnick, N.I. 1988: A new Cryptocellus (Arachnida: Ricinulei) from Brazil. Journal of the New York Entomological Society, 96: 363-366

External links
 

Animals described in 1988
Taxa named by Norman I. Platnick
Ricinulei
Fauna of Brazil